i-Free is a group of companies operating in various segments of IT market. The group evolved from i-Free company, founded in 2001 in St.Petersburg, Russia, that was focusing on creation and distribution of mobile content. Currently i-Free Group includes more than 20 companies and startups. i-Free is a specialist developer and implementer of projects in mobile and NFC technology, digital content distribution, electronic payments and micropayments, applications for smartphones and new network devices, AI technologies, creation of smart home interfaces, promotion of digital products on B2C market and B2B projects in mobile marketing.

In 2014, i-Free was ranked sixth in the list of top Russian Internet companies by Forbes. In 2013, i-Free turnover was equal to $250 million.

i-Free is present and operates successfully outside Russia with offices in Mumbai (India), Beijing (China), Minsk (Belarus), and Almaty (Kazakhstan). i-Free products and services are now available in more than 100[2] countries[3]. Group headquarters are located in St.Petersburg, Russia.

i-Free is partnering with manufacturers of mobile devices, mobile networks operators in Russia, CIS, India and China, with banks, transnational brands, TV networks, publishers, media groups, Internet resources, as well as engineering startups.

Group structure 
Currently i-Free Group includes more than 20 companies and startups. Companies working in priority areas of activity:

Beskontakt LLC, founded in 2012 as a department for the development of innovative solutions based on contactless technologies. One of its key directions is NFC payments. "Beskontakt"'s flagship product is the «Wallet» (NFC Wallet), a mobile app that enables over-the-air download of Mobile MasterCard PayPass cards as well as lets pay for goods and services with just one touch of phone. Apart from bank cards, one can also download transport cards into the "Wallet". To pay for the passage in urban transport, the passenger has just to put the phone against the busman's mobile terminal. This technological solution stands out among similar solutions on the Russian market, as the user doesn't need to get a special SIM card from mobile network operator; it is also possible to add money to the transport card directly in the NFC Wallet using the banking card. Currently the "Wallet" is integrated into Sony, HTC and Philips smartphones; urban transport payments are available in ten Russian cities. "Wallet" app is based on Beskontakt LLC proprietary platform, TSM (Trusted Service Manager) that has got PCI/DSS and MasterCard GVCP compliance certificates.

i-Free Ventures, founded in 2011, provides funding, training and mentoring for startups and engineering companies at any moment, from Seed to Early Growth Stage. Considers not only projects with approved business models for well-known markets, but also projects with unobvious monetization system, dealing with segmented markets. Startups sponsored by the foundation are targeting the Russian market as well as European, Asian and North-American markets[6]. Depending on the project, investment volume may vary from tens of thousands up to half million dollars. The foundation also assists its projects in their search for funding of following development stages.

i-Free Business Solutions, founded in 2004, focuses on marketing projects based on mobile technologies. Competencies: Digital Marketing, Mobile CRM, SMS notifications, development of mobile apps for any mobile platforms, implementation of promo offers for FMCG brands and retail. Company equipment makes it possible to deal with marketing tasks of any complexity, as well as to conduct national scale campaigns, including complex ones that integrate all types of mobile technologies (SMS, IVR, WAP, WEB, Java, and QR Code). Another area of company activities is the development of mobile banking apps for various platforms (iOS, Android, Windows Mobile) and the implementation of SMS notification services and banking account remote management via mobile devices. Banks partnering with the company have access to the full line of USSD, HLR, IMSI, and NFC services.

HeroCraft is a developer and publisher of mobile and PC games. The company was founded in 2002 and headquartered in Kaliningrad, Russia. It also operates offices in St. Petersburg, Minsk, Krasnodar, Novokuznetsk (Russia), Donetsk (Ukraine), as well as in China, Spain and UK. HeroCraft develops games for iOS, Android, BlackBerry, Windows Phone, and PC as well as social media games; it also distributes games in 15 languages.

SMSDirect, founded in 2008, focuses on SMS notification services. It owns a complete set of tools necessary for providing SMS notification services, from web interface for independent work and working through a personal account manager up to an API for integration with internal systems (HTTP/XML API, SMPP 3.4). Today, the company provides integrated direct notification and advertising services using various technological channels, such as voice (IVR system), SMS, e-mail, USSD.

Synqera is focusing on technologies of marketing communication personalization in retail business. By analyzing Big Data that include the sales, customer profiles in the loyalty program, efficiency of previous promo campaigns and even the weather at the moment of purchase, the solution provides exact targeting of special offers made by the retailer or a brand. This platform ensures the management of multichannel campaigns by delivering individualized content via interactive devices at the points of sale, mobile apps, text messages and e-mail. Synqera was founded in 2010 and operates on Russian, European and North-American markets.

History 

i-Free has been founded in 2001 in St. Petersburg, Russia, by Kirill Gorynya, Kirill Petrov, and Serguey Shulga.

2001-2003 Company becomes one of the first additional mobile services developers and providers in Russia. It provides a wide selection of mobile content and is among the TOP-3 content providers on the Russian market.[8]

2004-2006 The company starts operations outside Russia, first providing services in Ukraine, then in Kazakhstan; in 2006, it starts working in India, China, Brazil and Mexico. Today, i-Free runs offices in India, China, Kazakhstan, and Belarus. Via UFT, i-Free products and services are available in more than 100 countries.

2005-2010 Active market development in various mobile content services and related areas. Several highly specialized divisions are created, such as FounDreams, Planet3, i-Free Business Solution, and SMSDirect.

2013-2014 In 2010-2014, the total volume of investments into innovative projects and startups was about $50 million. i-Free was supporting more than 50 innovative projects dealing with AI, electronic finance, "smart home" systems, Smart TV, multiplayer games, electronic media, NFC based services, retail technologies, mobile payments, e-commerce, electronic advertising networks, and mobile messengers. As startups and engineering projects continue to consolidate around the company, a reform becomes a logical necessity – in 2013 i-Free is transformed into a group of companies. In 2014, i-Free undergoes restructuring, which aims at switching all available resources to the most promising business areas, such as mobile games producing and publishing, B2B projects, implementation of NFC-based solutions, investment and external assets management, solutions for mobile devices manufacturers. Close attention is paid to projects that make use of artificial intelligence. AI platform created by a Russian developer V.Veselov and acquired by i-Free wins the main prize at Turing-100 competition; then i-Free provides it for the creation of the first bionic man in the world. In June 2014, chat bot "Eugene Goostman" built on this platform becomes the first chat bot in the world that has successfully passed Turing's test.

In 2014, i-Free has signed a partner agreement with "Skolkovo" foundation, which includes researches inn the domain of payment security and mobile phone user identification as well as the creation of unique algorithms and software that ensure user identification for the payments, obtainment of governmental services, remote conclusion of contracts and urban transport ticket payments. Besides, this agreement also covers researches in the domain of BigData processing and the creation of effective models of customers' interaction with mobile terminals in the points of sale. Plans are to create i-Free R&D Center on the premises of "Skolkovo" foundation.

Company management

Technological contribution 
i-Free Groups takes part in all main events aiming at the development of mobile industry and market of mobile- and contactless-based innovative services. In 2004, i-Free was the mover of Mobile VAS Conference (Mobile VAS & Apps Conference since 2011, Mobile Trends Forum since 2013), the biggest international conference in Eastern Europe. Until 2013, i-Free acted as forum key partner; then in 2013 the company became forum organizer.

In 2005, i-Free was one of the driving forces behind the Association of Mobile Services and Content Providers. In 2007, 
United Fun Traders (UFT) alliance has been founded, whose task is the global promotion of products created by Russian content providers. In 2009, i-Free together with other key players of electronic and mobile payments market took part in the foundation of "Russian E-Money" association.

In 2010, in order to stimulate the development of contactless technologies in Russia, i-Free has produced an educational movie; in 2012, this movie was awarded the Silver Dolphin  at Cannes Corporate Media & TV Awards.

An important contribution to the development of Russian mobile industry is also made by "i-Free Academy". This is a unique educational project, aiming at professional development and extension of competencies of people involved in mobile industry

i-Free Academy 
i-Free Academy", first established in 2012, is a strategic project, which solves the problem of employees' professional and career growth. This educational course enables the students to see the entire process of product or project development, to take part at every stage of the process, to acquire new knowledge and skills. 
Academy is a system of immersion courses 1.5–2 months long; after the topic of the next course is announced, any i-Free employee may apply, specifying the need for his/her participation. On the results of competitive selection made by an expert board, 15-20 persons are admitted to attend the course.
Classes normally take place outside of working hours (in the evening and at week-ends) and include both theory and skills. Most eminent Russian professionals and professors give lectures, while practical trainings are managed by top market experts. During the classes, students are organized in teams to build up projects that they need to maintain in a discussion with the expert board. Best projects obtain funding and are implemented by their authors.    
i-Free Academy helps to define the most active employees that are eager to grow professionally; it also ensures quick and fruitful exchange of expert knowledge, boosts professional and personal relations between various divisions, gets a dialogue with top managers under way (i-Free top managers are involved in every Academy course) and gives employees motivation for professional and career growth. 
Topics of Academy courses reflect current i-Free strategic objectives. Completed courses include "i-Marketing" ("Innovative Marketing in the Domain of Mobile Apps"), «TechAdemy: Development of a Successful IT-Project", "i-Management" ("Managing an Innovative IT company Resources"), etc. "i-Management" (organized in 2013) has left a particularly important mark in i-Free history, as it allowed to take crucial decisions concerning management rotation and to complete management consulting procedure for key business units.

Criticism 

In 2009, there was a tide of discontent over mobile network operators, content providers and aggregators; the media accused them of supporting fraudulent services and willful deceit of subscribers in what concerns service rates. A number of publications dealing with this topic offered a detailed analysis of the situation that revealed the imperfections of micropayment market models. Leading RuNet web sites, such as VKontakte, Odnoklassniki and Mail.ru, were cited among those who use micropayments. According to market players, SMS micropayments give an important boost to the development of these resources and of RuNet in general. However, after passing through a long line of Internet agents, this instrument may fall into the hands of unfair web site developers, whose activities are out of operators' or aggregators' control. Since 2009, aggregators and operators undertake strong measures against network fraud and make serious efforts to remedy the situation, including cooperation with law enforcement, e.g.. with department "K" of Russian Ministry of the Interior in order to identify swindlers. 
At the end of year 2011, i-Free was mentioned at mobile operators' forums as a content provider that exploits its position. E.g., forum users pretended that i-Free provided unsolicited paid services to the subscribers, including subscription of 3G modems for some services, as checking balance is harder in this case as well as SMS notifications. This info appeared also during the uproar caused by the break of email belonging to a former MTS top manager. However, i-Free didn't provide content aggregation services since July 2011; most claims were based on obsolete information concerning the aggregator name that users received from mobile operators' call centers. 
In 2012, i-Free was mentioned in connection with "Girls Around Me" service developed by startup "Places Around Me", which received funding from i-Free Ventures. This service has drawn mixed reaction from foreign community. In March 2012, some European and American media expressed sharp criticism over Girls Around Me, pretending that the app allows its users to get personal data of Foursquare and Facebook users, to chase social media users and follow them. These claims were groundless, as the service was using only the data that Foursquare users had made public through the social media itself. The app did not receive and/or distribute any private information. It was equally impossible to follow and chase people through "Girls Around Me". Although complaints against the app were unreasoned, i-Free decided to cut off the funding of this project.

References

Companies based in Saint Petersburg
Companies established in 2001
Russian brands
Technology companies of Russia